The Rana is a title used by different Rajput clans across India, Pakistan and Nepal. In India and Nepal, they are predominantly Hindus. While in Pakistan and some parts of northern India, Rajputs (Ranghar, Meo, Minhas etc)are predominantly Muslims.

Rana rule in Nepal
The Rana rule in Nepal from the mid-1800s to the mid-1900s saw a whole century of oppression of Nepalese who became Buddhist monks. The first victims were Nepalese Mahayana (Tibetans) who converted to Buddhism, then Theravada Buddhism in the "History of Theravada Buddhism in Nepal" to stop their discriminatory practices.

Dress
The dressing varies from region to region. Historically, traditional Indian clothings were worn.

References

Social groups of Gujarat